Maloye Chebayevo is a rural locality (a village) in Pokrovksoye Rural Settlement, Velikoustyugsky District, Vologda Oblast, Russia. The population was 29 as of 2002.

Geography 
Maloye Chebayevo is located 35 km southeast of Veliky Ustyug (the district's administrative centre) by road. Ilyinskoye is the nearest rural locality.

References 

Rural localities in Velikoustyugsky District